The Eindhoven Water Towers in Eindhoven, Netherlands, were designed by W.G. Quist (Chief Government Architect of the Netherlands, 1974–1979) and built in 1970. 

In the late sixties the older water tower on Elschot Willemlaan proved to be inadequate. Due to its lack of capacity and general deterioration, the tower could no longer meet the growing demand. Thus it was decided that a new one should be constructed at the Anthony Coolenlaan, around the corner from the existing tower and the water company headquarters.

The structure consists of three spherical tanks, each standing on its own  spire. The innovative design of three tank-towers together created the largest water tower complex in the Netherlands.

See also
Union Watersphere

References

Towers completed in 1970
Water towers in the Netherlands
Towers in North Brabant
Tourist attractions in North Brabant
Buildings and structures in Eindhoven